Anochetus pattersoni is a species of ant in the subfamily Ponerinae. It was discovered on 19 December 2005 by S.M. Goodman in the Seychelles and described by Fisher, B. L. & Smith, M. A. in 2008.

References

External links

Ponerinae
Insects described in 2008